Empty Bell Ringing in the Sky is the fifth studio album by the rock band Pelt. It was released in 1999 through VHF Records.

Accolades

Track listing

Personnel 
Pelt
Patrick Best – instruments
Mike Gangloff – vocals, instruments
Jack Rose – instruments
Production and additional personnel
Maya Hayuk – photography
Bill Kellum – production
Pelt – production

References

External links 
 

1999 albums
Pelt (band) albums
VHF Records albums